This is a list of major and frequently observed neurological disorders (e.g., Alzheimer's disease), symptoms (e.g., back pain), signs (e.g., aphasia) and syndromes (e.g., Aicardi syndrome). There is disagreement over the definitions and criteria used to delineate various disorders and whether some of these conditions should be classified as mental disorders or in other ways.

# 
22q13 deletion syndrome

A 
Abulia
Achromatopsia
Addiction
Acquired brain injury
Agraphia
Agnosia
Aicardi syndrome
AIDS – neurological manifestations
Akinetopsia
Alcohol related brain damage
Alcoholism
Alcoholic dementia
Alien hand syndrome
Allan–Herndon–Dudley syndrome
Alternating hemiplegia of childhood
Alzheimer's disease
Amaurosis fugax
Amnesia
Amyotrophic lateral sclerosis
Acephalia 
Aneurysm
Angelman syndrome
Anosognosia
Aphasia
Aphantasia
Apraxia
Arachnoiditis
Arnold–Chiari malformation
Asomatognosia
Asperger syndrome
Ataxia
ATR-16 syndrome
Attention deficit hyperactivity disorder
Attention deficit hyperactivity disorder predominately inattentive
Auditory processing disorder
Autism spectrum disorder

B 
Back pain
Behçet's disease
Bell's palsy
Bipolar disorder
Blindsight
Blindness
Blurred vision
Brain damage
Brachial plexus injury
Brain death
Brain injury
Brain infarction
Brain tumor
Brody myopathy

C 
Canavan disease 
Capgras delusion
Carpal tunnel syndrome
Causalgia
Central pain syndrome
Central pontine myelinolysis
Centronuclear myopathy 
Cephalic disorder
Cerebral aneurysm
Cerebral arteriosclerosis
Cerebral atrophy
Cerebral autosomal dominant arteriopathy with subcortical infarcts and leukoencephalopathy
Cerebral dysgenesis–neuropathy–ichthyosis–keratoderma syndrome
Cerebral gigantism
Cerebral palsy
Cerebral vasculitis
Cerebrospinal fluid leak
Cervical spinal stenosis
Charcot–Marie–Tooth disease
Chiari malformation
Chorea
Chronic fatigue syndrome
Chronic inflammatory demyelinating polyneuropathy
Chronic pain
Cluster headache
Cockayne syndrome
Coffin–Lowry syndrome
Coma
Complex post-traumatic stress disorder
Complex regional pain syndrome
Compression neuropathy
Congenital distal spinal muscular atrophy
Congenital facial diplegia
Color blindness
Cornelia de Lange syndrome
Corticobasal degeneration
Cotard delusion
Cranial arteritis
Craniosynostosis
Creutzfeldt–Jakob disease
Cumulative trauma disorders
Cushing's syndrome
Cyclic vomiting syndrome
Cyclothymic disorder
Cytomegalic inclusion body disease
Cytomegalovirus Infection

D 
Dandy–Walker syndrome
Dawson disease
De Morsier's syndrome
Dejerine–Klumpke palsy
Dejerine–Sottas disease
Delayed sleep phase disorder or syndrome
Dementia
Dermatillomania
Dermatomyositis
Developmental coordination disorder
Diabetic neuropathy
Disc herniation
Diffuse sclerosis
Diplopia
Disorders of consciousness
Distal hereditary motor neuropathy type V
Distal spinal muscular atrophy type 1
Distal spinal muscular atrophy type 2
Dizziness
Down syndrome
Dravet syndrome
Duchenne muscular dystrophy
Dysarthria
Dysautonomia
Dyscalculia
Dysphagia
Dysgraphia
Dyskinesia
Dyslexia
Dystonia

E 
Empty sella syndrome
Encephalitis
Encephalocele
Encephalopathy
Encephalotrigeminal angiomatosis
Encopresis
Enuresis
Epilepsy
Epilepsy-intellectual disability in females
Erb's palsy
Erythromelalgia
Essential tremor
Exploding head syndrome

F 
Fabry's disease
Fahr's syndrome
Fainting
Familial spastic paralysis
Fetal alcohol syndrome
Febrile seizures
Fisher syndrome
Fibromyalgia
Foville's syndrome
Fragile X syndrome
Fragile X-associated tremor/ataxia syndrome
Friedreich's ataxia
Frontotemporal dementia
Functional neurological symptom disorder

G 
Gaucher's disease
Generalized anxiety disorder
Generalized epilepsy with febrile seizures plus
Gerstmann's syndrome
Giant cell arteritis
Giant cell inclusion disease
Globoid cell leukodystrophy
Gray matter heterotopia
Guillain–Barré syndrome

H 
Head injury
Headache
Hemicrania Continua
Hemifacial spasm
Hemispatial neglect 
Hereditary motor neuropathies
Hereditary spastic paraplegia
Heredopathia atactica polyneuritiformis
Herpes zoster
Herpes zoster oticus
Hirayama syndrome
Hirschsprung's disease
Holmes–Adie syndrome
Holoprosencephaly
HTLV-1 associated myelopathy
Huntington's disease
Hydrocephalia
Hydranencephaly
Hydrocephalus
Hypercortisolism
Hypoalgesia
Hypoesthesia
Hypoxia

I 
Immune-mediated encephalomyelitis
Inclusion body myositis
Incontinentia pigmenti
Infantile spasms
Inflammatory myopathy
Intellectual disability
Intracranial cyst
Intracranial hypertension
Isodicentric 15

J 
Joubert syndrome

K 
Karak syndrome
Kearns–Sayre syndrome
Kinsbourne syndrome
Kleine–Levin syndrome
Klippel Feil syndrome
Krabbe disease
Korsakoff Syndrome
Kufor–Rakeb syndrome
Kugelberg–Welander disease – see Spinal muscular atrophy

L 
 Lafora disease
 Lambert–Eaton myasthenic syndrome
 Landau–Kleffner syndrome
 Lateral medullary (Wallenberg) syndrome
 Learning disabilities
 Leigh's disease
 Lennox–Gastaut syndrome
 Lesch–Nyhan syndrome
 Leukodystrophy
 Leukoencephalopathy with vanishing white matter
 Lewy body dementia
 Lissencephaly
 Locked-in syndrome
 Lou Gehrig's disease – see Amyotrophic lateral sclerosis
 Lumbar disc disease
 Lumbar hernia
 Lumbar spinal stenosis
 Lupus erythematosus – neurological sequelae
 Lyme disease

M 
Machado–Joseph disease
Macrencephaly
Macrocephalia
Macropsia
Mal de debarquement
Megalencephalic leukoencephalopathy with subcortical cysts
Megalencephaly
Melkersson–Rosenthal syndrome
Menieres disease
Meningitis
Menkes disease
Metachromatic leukodystrophy
Microcephaly
Micropsia
Migraine
Mild brain injury
Miller Fisher syndrome
Mini-stroke (transient ischemic attack)
Misophonia
Mitochondrial myopathy
Mobius syndrome
Monomelic amyotrophy
Morvan syndrome
Motor neurone disease – see Amyotrophic lateral sclerosis
Motor skills disorder
Moyamoya disease
Mucopolysaccharidoses
Multifocal motor neuropathy
Multi-infarct dementia
Multiple sclerosis
Multiple system atrophy
Muscular dystrophy
Myalgic encephalomyelitis
Myasthenia gravis
Myelinoclastic diffuse sclerosis
Myoclonic Encephalopathy of infants
Myoclonus
Myopathy
Myotonia congenita
Myotubular myopathy

N 
Narcolepsy
Neuralgia
Neuro-Behçet's disease
Neurofibromatosis
Neuroleptic malignant syndrome
Neuromyotonia
Neuronal ceroid lipofuscinosis
Neuronal migration disorders
Neuropathy
Neurosis
Niemann–Pick disease
Non-24-hour sleep–wake disorder
Nonverbal learning disorder

O 
Occipital Neuralgia
Occult spinal dysraphism sequence
Ohtahara syndrome
Olivopontocerebellar atrophy
Opsoclonus myoclonus syndrome
Optic neuritis 
Orthostatic hypotension
O'Sullivan–McLeod syndrome
Otosclerosis
Overuse syndrome

P 
Palinopsia
PANDAS
Pantothenate kinase-associated neurodegeneration
Paraplegia
Paralysis
Paramyotonia congenita
Paresthesia
Paresis 
Parkinson('s) disease
Paraneoplastic diseases
Paroxysmal attacks
Parry–Romberg syndrome
Pelizaeus–Merzbacher disease
Periodic paralyses
Peripheral neuropathy
Pervasive developmental disorders
Phantom limb / Phantom pain
Photic sneeze reflex
Phytanic acid storage disease
Pick's disease
Pinched nerve
Pituitary tumors
Polyneuropathy
PMG
Polio
Polymicrogyria
Polymyositis
Porencephaly
Post-polio syndrome
Postherpetic neuralgia
Posttraumatic stress disorder
Postural hypotension
Postural orthostatic tachycardia syndrome
Prader–Willi syndrome
Primary lateral sclerosis
Prion diseases
Progressive hemifacial atrophy
Progressive multifocal leukoencephalopathy
Progressive supranuclear palsy
Prosopagnosia
Pseudotumor cerebri

Q 
Quadrantanopia
Quadriplegia

R 
Rabies
Radiculopathy
Ramsay Hunt syndrome type I
Ramsay Hunt syndrome type II
Ramsay Hunt syndrome type III – see Ramsay–Hunt syndrome
Rasmussen encephalitis
Reflex neurovascular dystrophy
Refsum disease
REM sleep behavior disorder
Repetitive stress injury
Restless legs syndrome
Retrovirus-associated myelopathy
Rett syndrome
Reye's syndrome
Rhythmic movement disorder
Romberg syndrome

S 
Savant syndrome 
Saint Vitus dance
Sandhoff disease
Sanfilippo syndrome
Schilder's disease (two distinct conditions)
Schizencephaly
Sclerosis
Seizures
Sensory processing disorder
Septo-optic dysplasia
Shaken baby syndrome
Shingles
Shy–Drager syndrome
Sjögren's syndrome
Sleep apnea
Sleeping sickness
Slurred speech
Snatiation
Sotos syndrome
Spasticity
Spina bifida
Spinal and bulbar muscular atrophy
Spinal cord injury
Spinal cord tumors
Spinal muscular atrophy
Spinal muscular atrophy with respiratory distress type 1 – see Distal spinal muscular atrophy type 1
Spinocerebellar ataxia 
Split-brain
Steele–Richardson–Olszewski syndrome – see Progressive supranuclear palsy
Stiff-person syndrome
Stroke
Sturge–Weber syndrome
Stuttering
Subacute sclerosing panencephalitis
Subcortical arteriosclerotic encephalopathy
Superficial siderosis
Sydenham's chorea
Syncope
Synesthesia
Syringomyelia
Substance use disorder

T 
Traumatic encephalopathy
Tardive dyskinesia
Tarlov cyst
Tarsal tunnel syndrome
Tay–Sachs disease
Temporal arteritis
Temporal lobe epilepsy
Tetanus
Tethered spinal cord syndrome
Thalamocortical dysrhythmia
Thomsen disease
Thoracic outlet syndrome
Tic Douloureux
Tinnitus
Todd's paralysis
Tourette syndrome
Toxic encephalopathy
Transient ischemic attack
Transmissible spongiform encephalopathies
Transverse myelitis
Traumatic brain injury
Tremor
Trichotillomania
Trigeminal neuralgia
Tropical spastic paraparesis
Trypanosomiasis
Tuberous sclerosis

U 
Unconsciousness
Unverricht–Lundborg disease

V 
Vestibular schwannoma
Vertigo
Viliuisk encephalomyelitis
Visual Snow
Von Hippel–Lindau disease

W 
Wallenberg's syndrome
Werdnig–Hoffmann disease – see Spinal muscular atrophy
Wernicke's encephalopathy
Wernicke Korsakoff syndrome
West syndrome
Whiplash
Williams syndrome
Wilson's disease

Y 
Y-Linked hearing impairment

Z 
Zellweger syndrome

See also 
 List of mental disorders

References 
The source of this list is from the NIH public domain 

Neurological disorders
Neurological disorders